This is a list of all managers of the Neftchi Baku professional football club of Azerbaijan, including performance records and honours.

Neftchi Baku have had many managers and head coaches throughout their history, below is a chronological list of them from when Azerbaijan Premier League was changed into a league format.

The most successful Neftchi manager in terms of trophies won is Kazbek Tuaev, who won three Azerbaijan Premier League titles and two Azerbaijan Cup trophies in his 6-year reign as manager.

Statistics
''Information correct as of match played 21 May 2022. Only competitive matches are counted.

Notes:
P – Total of played matches
W – Won matches
D – Drawn matches
L – Lost matches
GS – Goal scored
GA – Goals against
%W – Percentage of matches won

Nationality is indicated by the corresponding FIFA country code(s).

Gallery

References

Neftchi Baku managers
Neftchi Baku
Neftchi
Neftchi